Adlinda is the third-largest multiring structure (impact crater) on Jupiter's moon Callisto, measuring ~ 1000 km in diameter. It is situated in the southern hemisphere of Callisto. The name is taken from Inuit mythology.

The relatively young, large Lofn impact crater is superposed on Adlinda. The bright deposits from this crater cover about 30% of the surface of  Adlinda hindering detailed study. Lofn is an example of a flat floored impact crater.

References 

Surface features on Callisto (moon)
Impact craters on Jupiter's moons